Dwayne Broyles (born July 10, 1982) is an American former professional basketball player who has played in the Euroleague, was an All-Star in four different European leagues and won three consecutive Belgium Championships.

Broyles is currently an executive of a sports firm that represented NBA players and some of the best American players in Europe. Broyles is also a trainer and entrepreneur.

Career
Though Broyles was a standout player at James Madison University and an all-conference player, Broyles went undrafted by the NBA. Dwayne Broyles then started his career in the eastern European bloc, countries like Croatia and Latvia playing for three teams before being recognized for his good play and moving to historic Belgian Champion Club Spirou Charleroi. For the 2012–13 season, Broyles signed with Orléans Loiret Basket, but before the season started he got injured. He later made an agreement with the club to leave and get surgery on his knee. Broyles had his surgery performed by the renown Dr. James Andrews. In November 2013, he signed a two-month deal with Bnei Herzliya. On February 21, 2014 Broyles returned to Spirou Charleroi for the rest of the season. On October 31, 2016, Broyles retired from basketball.

References

External links 
 Eurobasket.com Profile
 Euroleague.net Profile
 FIBA.com Profile

1982 births
Living people
ABA League players
American expatriate basketball people in Belgium
American expatriate basketball people in Croatia
American expatriate basketball people in Israel
American expatriate basketball people in Latvia
ASK Riga players
Basketball players from Canton, Ohio
Bnei Hertzeliya basketball players
James Madison Dukes men's basketball players
KK Zagreb players
Small forwards
Spirou Charleroi players
American men's basketball players